Patrick Blanc (born 28 April 1972) is a French ski mountaineer.

Blanc is born in Évian-les-Bains, Haute-Savoie and has been member of the national team since 2002. In 2008 he has been suspended from competitions for two years due to a positive dope test at the Patrouille des Glaciers race.

Selected results 
 2002:
 2nd, World Championship single race
 2nd, World Championship team race (together with Tony Sbalbi)
 2nd, World Championship combination ranking
 2nd, French Championship single
 2004:
 1st, World Championship vertical race
 1st, World Championship team race (together with Florent Perrier)
 1st, World Championship relay race (together with Stéphane Brosse, Cédric Tomio and Florent Perrier)
 6th, World Championship single race
 2005
 3rd, World Cup team race (together with Stéphane Brosse)
 2006:
 1st, World Championship vertical race
 1st, World Championship team race (together with Stéphane Brosse)
 2nd, World Championship relay race (together with Grégory Gachet, Stéphane Brosse and Florent Perrier)
 2007:
 9th, European Championship team race (together with Tony Sbalbi)
 2008:
 6th, World Championship team race (together with Didier Blanc)

Patrouille des Glaciers 

 1998: 7th (and 2nd, "seniors I" ranking), together with Stéphane Millius and Alberto Colajanni
 2004: 1st and course record, together with Jean Pellissier and Stéphane Brosse
 2006: 1st and course record, together with Stéphane Brosse and Guido Giacomelli

Pierra Menta 

 2002: 6th, together with Tony Sbalbi
 2003: 1st, together with Tony Sbalbi
 2004: 6th, together with Tony Sbalbi
 2005: 1st, together with Stéphane Brosse
 2006: 1st, together with Stéphane Brosse
 2008: 3rd, together with Peter Svätojánsky

Trofeo Mezzalama 
 2003: 9th, together with Cédric Tomio and Tony Sbalbi
 2005: 1st, together with Stéphane Brosse and Guido Giacomelli
 2007: 2nd, together with Florent Perrier and Grégory Gachet

References

External links 
 Patrick Blanc at SkiMountaineering.org

1972 births
Living people
People from Évian-les-Bains
French male ski mountaineers
World ski mountaineering champions
French sportspeople in doping cases
Sportspeople from Haute-Savoie